Sherpa (also Sharpa, Xiaerba, or Sherwa) is a Tibetic language spoken in Nepal and the Indian state of Sikkim, mainly by the Sherpa. The majority speakers of the Sherpa language live in the Khumbu region of Nepal, spanning from the Chinese (Tibetan) border in the east to the Bhotekosi River in the west. About 200,000 speakers live in Nepal (2001 census), some 20,000 in Sikkim (1997) and some 800 in Tibetan Autonomous Region (1994). Sherpa is a subject-object-verb (SOV) language. Sherpa is predominantly a spoken language, although it is occasionally written using either the Devanagari or Tibetan script.

Phonology 
Sherpa is a tonal language. Sherpa has the following consonants:

Consonants 

 Stop sounds  can be unreleased  in word-final position.
 Palatal sounds  can neutralize to velar sounds  when preceding .
  can become a retroflex nasal  when preceding a retroflex stop.
  can have an allophone of  when occurring in fast speech.

Vowels 

 Vowel sounds  have the allophones  when between consonants and in closed syllables.

Tones 
There are four distinct tones; high , falling , low , rising .

Grammar 

Some grammatical aspects of Sherpa are as follows:
 Nouns are defined by morphology when a bare noun occurs in the genitive and this extends to the noun phrase. They are defined syntactically by co-occurrence with the locative clitic and by their position in the noun phrase (NP) after demonstratives.
 Demonstratives are defined syntactically by their position first in the NP directly before the noun.
 Quantifiers: Number words occur last in the noun phrase with the exception of the definite article.
 Adjectives occur after the noun in the NP and morphologically only take genitive marking when in construct with a noun.
 Verbs may morphologically be distinguished by differing or suppletive roots for the perfective, imperfective, and imperative.  They occur last in a clause before the verbal auxiliaries.
 Verbal auxiliaries occur last in a clause.
 Postpositions occur last in a postpositional NP.

Other typological features of Sherpa include split ergativity based on aspect, SO & OV (SOV), N-A, N-Num, V-Aux, and N-Pos.

Vocabulary 
The following table lists the days of the week, which are derived from the Tibetan language ("Pur-gae").

Sample Text 
The following is a sample text in Sherpa of Article 1 of the Universal Declaration of Human Rights:

Sherpa in Devanagari script

मि रिग ते रि रङ्वाङ् दङ् चिथोङ गि थोप्थङ डडइ थोग् क्येउ यिन्। गङ् ग नम्ज्योद दङ् शेस्रब् ल्हन्क्ये सु ओद्दुब् यिन् चङ् । फर्छुर च्यिग्गि-च्यिग्ल पुन्ग्यि दुशेस्   ज्योग्गोग्यि।        

Sherpa in Tibetan script

མི་རིགས་ཏེ་རི་རང་དབང་དང་རྩི་མཐོང་གི་ཐོབ་ཐང་འདྲ་འདྲའི་ཐོག་སྐྱེའུ་ཡིན། གང་ག་རྣམ་དཔྱོད་དང་ཤེས་རབ་ལྷན་སྐྱེས་སུ་འོད་དུབ་ཡིན་ཙང་། ཕར་ཚུར་གཅིག་གིས་གཅིག་ལ་སྤུན་གྱི་འདུ་ཤེས་འཇོག་དགོས་ཀྱི།

Sherpa in the Wylie Transliteration

mi rigs te ri rang dbang dang rtsi thong gi thob thang 'dra 'dra'i thog skyeu yin/ gang ga rnam dpyod dang shes rab lhan skyes su 'od dub yin tsang/ phar tshur gcig gis gcig la spun gyi 'du shes 'jog dgos kyi/

Translation

Article 1:  All human beings are born free and equal in dignity and rights. They are endowed with reason and conscience and should act towards one another in a spirit of brotherhood.

References

External links 
 Himali Sherpa:Sherpa Culture dictionary
 Sherpa-English and English-Sherpa Dictionary
 Sherpa dictionary  Print edition
 Sherpa language Omniglot

Languages of Nepal
South Bodish languages
Subject–object–verb languages
Languages of Sikkim
Languages of Tibet
Languages written in Devanagari
Languages of Koshi Province